This is a list of Portuguese television related events from 2017.

Events 
 January 21 - David Antunes wins the fourth series of A tua Cara Não me é Estranha
 January 29 - Carlos Sousa wins the fourth series of Secret Story: Desafio Final
 May 13 - Portugal wins the 62nd Eurovision Song Contest in Kyiv, Ukraine. The winning song is "Amar pelos dois", performed by Salvador Sobral.

Television shows

Programs debuting in 2017

Programs ending in 2017

Television films and specials

Programs returning in 2017 

 
Television in Portugal